The 2021 Michigan Wolverines women's soccer team represented the University of Michigan during the 2021 NCAA Division I women's soccer season. It was the 28th season the university fielded a women's varsity soccer team, and their 28th season in the Big Ten Conference. The team was coached by fourth year head coach Jennifer Klein. Michigan won the 2021 Big Ten Women's Soccer Tournament for the first time since 1999.

Squad information

Coaching staff

Schedule 

|-
!colspan=8 style=""| Exhibition
|-

|-

|-
!colspan=8 style=""| Regular season
|-

|-
!colspan=6 style=""| Big Ten Tournament
|-

|-
!colspan=6 style=""| NCAA Tournament
|-

|-

Rankings

References

External links  
 UM Women's Soccer

2021
Michigan Wolverines
Michigan Wolverines women's soccer
2021 NCAA Division I women's soccer season
Michigan